The dusky slender opossum (Marmosops fuscatus) is a species of opossum in the family Didelphidae. It is found in Colombia, Trinidad and Tobago, and Venezuela. It is threatened by habitat loss.

References

Opossums
Mammals of the Caribbean
Mammals of Colombia
Mammals of Trinidad and Tobago
Mammals of Venezuela
Mammals described in 1896
Taxa named by Oldfield Thomas
Taxonomy articles created by Polbot